Klika is a surname. Notable people with the surname include:

Bill Klika, (born 1945), American football and baseball coach
Bohumil Klika (1868–1942), Czech zoologist and paleontologist, also known as Gottlieb Klika
Čeněk Klika, Czech Scouting official
Miloš Klika (1890–?), Bohemian fencer
Russell Klika (born 1960), American military photojournalist
Klika Klika (created 2012), A group of Greek Cypriot leventes from the Midlands, UK